The Legion of the Unliving is the name of five groups of fictional characters that appear in comic books published by Marvel Comics.

The five versions first appear in Avengers #131 (Jan. 1975); Avengers Annual #16 (Dec. 1987); Avengers West Coast #61 (Aug. 1990); Avengers #353 (Sep. 1992) and Avengers vol. 3, #10 (Nov. 1998) respectively. The groups were created by Steve Englehart and Sal Buscema; Tom DeFalco and various artists; Roy Thomas and Daniel Bulanadi; Len Kaminski and M.C. Wyman and Kurt Busiek and George Pérez.

Membership
listed alphabetically, after leader

Legion of the Unliving I
Avengers #131 - 132 (Jan. - Feb. 1975); Giant-Size Avengers #3 (Feb. 1975)

 Baron Heinrich Zemo - A Nazi scientist.
 Flying Dutchman's Ghost - Also referred to as the Captain of the Flying Dutchman.
 Frankenstein's Monster - A simulacrum created by Victor Frankenstein.
 Human Torch - A pyrokinetic android.
 Midnight - A martial artist. He is also known as Midnight Sun.
 Wonder Man - An ionic-powered superhero.

Legion of the Unliving II
Avengers Annual #16 (Dec. 1987)

 Baron Blood - A vampire.
 Black Knight (Sir Percy) - A black knight from the medieval times.
 Bucky Barnes - The sidekick of Captain America (it was later revealed Bucky never actually died).
 Captain Marvel - A Kree superhero.
 Death Adder - A death adder-themed villain (later revived).
 Dracula - A vampire lord (at the time all vampires in the Marvel Universe had been destroyed).
 Drax the Destroyer - A human enhanced by Kronos. (later revived)
 Executioner - An Asgardian half-giant.
 Green Goblin - This version is either Norman Osborn or Bart Hamilton (later Comics established that Norman Osborn had never actually died so it must be Hamilton).
 Hyperion - This is the Squadron Sinister version.
 Korvac - A computer technician from Earth-691.
 Nighthawk - The CEO of Richmond Enterprises.
 Red Guardian (Alexi Shostakov) - A superhero that was around during World War II.
 Swordsman (Jacques Duquesne) - A sword-wielding villain turned avenger
 Terrax the Tamer - A Herald of Galactus. (later revived)

Legion of the Unliving III
Avengers West Coast #61 (Aug. 1990)

 Black Knight (Nathan Garrett) - A descendant of Sir Percy of Scandia and an enemy of Giant-Man who uses an arsenal of medieval weapons that employ modern technology (including a lance that fired bolts of energy) and genetically engineers and creates a winged horse called Aragorn.
 Grim Reaper - The criminal brother of Wonder Man.
 Iron Man 2020 - A counterpart of Iron Man from the year 2020 on Earth-8410.
 Left Winger and Right Winger - A wrestling duo. They were not actually dead but in comas.
 Oort the Living Comet - A super-fast character from the future who claims to be an enemy of Quicksilver.
 Swordsman (Jacques Duquesne)
 Toro - A pyrokinetic partner of the Human Torch android.

Legion of the Unliving IV
Avengers #353 (Sep. 1992)

 Amenhotep - An ancient vampire.
 Baron Heinrich Zemo
 Count Nefaria - A Maggia crimelord with ion-based abilities.
 Inferno - A steel-skinned supervillain who can generate heat.
 Nebulon - An Ul'lula'n.
 Necrodamus - A sorcerer.
 Red Guardian (Alexi Shostakov)
 Star Stalker - A mutant Vorm.

Legion of the Unliving V
Avengers vol. 3, #10 (Nov. 1998)

 Captain Marvel
 Doctor Druid - A druid.
 Grim Reaper
 Hellcat - A cat-themed superhero.
 Mockingbird - This version is a Skrull imposter.
 Swordsman (Jacques Duquesne)
 Thunderstrike - A former host of Thor.
 Wonder Man

References 

Legion of the Unliving